Asadabad County is in Hamadan province, Iran. The capital of the county is the city of Asadabad. At the 2006 census, the county's population was 104,566 in 25,167 households. The following census in 2011 counted 107,006 people in 29,232 households. At the 2016 census, the county's population was 100,901 in 30,387 households.

Administrative divisions

The population history and structural changes of Asadabad County's administrative divisions over three consecutive censuses are shown in the following table. The latest census shows two districts, six rural districts, and two cities.

References

 

Counties of Hamadan Province